Pseudopeas is a genus of gastropods belonging to the family Achatinidae.

The species of this genus are found in Africa, Central America.

Species:

Pseudopeas bitzeense 
Pseudopeas burnupi 
Pseudopeas burunganum 
Pseudopeas camerunense 
Pseudopeas chariesterum 
Pseudopeas chlorum 
Pseudopeas concinnum 
Pseudopeas conspicuum 
Pseudopeas crossei 
Pseudopeas curvelliforme 
Pseudopeas egens 
Pseudopeas elachistum 
Pseudopeas elgonense 
Pseudopeas feai 
Pseudopeas foliatum 
Pseudopeas fusiforme 
Pseudopeas igembiense 
Pseudopeas imitans 
Pseudopeas iredalei 
Pseudopeas isseli 
Pseudopeas kekumeganum 
Pseudopeas koruensis 
Pseudopeas musolensis 
Pseudopeas opoboense 
Pseudopeas orestias 
Pseudopeas plebeium 
Pseudopeas pulchellum 
Pseudopeas pusillum 
Pseudopeas rumrutiense 
Pseudopeas saxatile 
Pseudopeas scalariforme 
Pseudopeas stenoterum 
Pseudopeas subcurvelliforme 
Pseudopeas tenue 
Pseudopeas thompsonae 
Pseudopeas thysvillense 
Pseudopeas ukaguruense 
Pseudopeas undulatum 
Pseudopeas valentini 
Pseudopeas victoriae 
Pseudopeas yalaensis

References

Gastropods